Helen Folasade Adu  (born 16 January 1959), known professionally as Sade Adu or simply Sade, is a Nigerian-born British singer, known as the lead singer of her eponymous band. One of the most successful British female artists in history, she is often recognised as an influence on contemporary music. Her success in the music industry was recognised with the Officer of the Order of the British Empire in 2002, and she was made Commander in the 2017 Birthday Honours.

Sade was born in Ibadan, Nigeria, and brought up partly in Essex, England, from the age of four. She studied at Saint Martin's School of Art in London and gained modest recognition as a fashion designer and part-time model, prior to joining the band Pride in the early 1980s. After gaining attention as a performer, she formed the band Sade, and secured a recording contract with Epic Records in 1983.

A year later the band released the album Diamond Life, which became one of the best-selling albums of the era, and the best-selling debut by a British female vocalist. In July 1985, Sade was among the performers at the Live Aid charity concert at Wembley Stadium, and the following year she appeared in the film Absolute Beginners. Following the band's third and fourth albums, Stronger Than Pride (1988) and Love Deluxe (1992), they went on hiatus after the birth of Sade's child.

After a spell of eight years without an album, the band reunited in 1999, and released Lovers Rock in 2000. The album departed from the jazz-inspired inflections of their previous work, featuring mellower sounds and pop compositions. The band then underwent another hiatus, not producing music for another ten years until the release of Soldier of Love. Following that album's release, the band entered a third period of extended hiatus, and have only released two songs ("Flower of the Universe" for the soundtrack of Disney's A Wrinkle in Time, and "The Big Unknown" as part of the soundtrack for Steve McQueen's film Widows) since.

Early life
Helen Folasade Adu was born on 16 January 1959 in Ibadan, Oyo State, Nigeria, but is a native of Ekiti State. Her middle name, Folasade, means "honour earns the crown". Her parents are Adebisi Adu, a Nigerian lecturer in economics of Yoruba background, and Anne Hayes, an English district nurse; they met in London, married in 1955, and moved to Nigeria. When Sade was four years old, her parents separated. Anne Hayes then returned to England, taking Sade and her elder brother Banji to live with their grandparents near Colchester, Essex. When Sade was 11 years old, she moved to Holland-on-Sea, Essex, to live with her mother. After completing her education at Clacton County High School and Colchester Institute at the age of 18, she moved to London and studied fashion design at Saint Martin's School of Art.

Career

1980–1984: Beginnings and Diamond Life
After completing a three-year course in fashion design, and later modelling briefly, Sade began backup singing with British band Pride. During this time, she formed a songwriting partnership with Pride's guitarist/saxophonist Stuart Matthewman; together, backed by Pride's rhythm section, they began doing their own sets at Pride gigs. Her solo performances of the song "Smooth Operator" attracted the attention of record companies, and in 1983 Sade and Matthewman split from Pride, along with keyboardist Andrew Hale, bassist Paul Denman and drummer Paul Cook, to form the band Sade. By the time she performed her first show at London's Heaven nightclub, she had become so popular that 1,000 people were turned away at the door. In May 1983, Sade performed their first US show at the Danceteria nightclub in New York City. On 18 October 1983, Sade Adu signed with Epic Records, while the rest of the band signed in 1984.

Following the record deal, the group began recording their debut album, Diamond Life, which took six weeks to record and was recorded entirely at The Power Plant in London. Diamond Life was released on 16 July 1984, reached number two in the UK Album Chart, sold over 1.2 million copies in the UK, and won the Brit Award for Best British Album in 1985. The album was also a hit internationally, reaching number one in several countries and the top ten in the US, where it has sold in excess of four million copies. Diamond Life had international sales of over six million copies, becoming one of the top-selling debut recordings of the '80s, and the best-selling debut ever by a British female vocalist.

"Your Love Is King" was released as the album's lead single on 25 February 1984 and was a success in European territories, charting at number seven in Ireland and number six on the UK Singles Chart. The song was less successful in the US, where it peaked at number 54 on the US Billboard Hot 100. The third single, "Smooth Operator", was released on 15 September 1984 and became the most successful song in the US from the album Diamond Life. The track peaked at number five on the US Billboard Hot 100 and the US Billboard Hot Black Singles, as well as peaking at number one on the US Billboard Adult Contemporary chart. In Europe the song fared well, peaking at number 19 in the UK, and reaching the top 20 in Austria, Switzerland, France, and Germany.

1985–2000: Continued success and first hiatus

In late 1985, the band released their second album, Promise, which peaked at number one in both the UK and the US and became the band's first album to reach number one on the US Billboard 200. The album topped the chart in 1986 and spent two weeks at the peak position. Eventually, the album went on to sell four million copies in the region and was certified four times platinum by the Recording Industry Association of America (RIAA). The album spawned two singles "Never as Good as the First Time" and "The Sweetest Taboo," the latter of which was released as the album's lead single and stayed on the US Hot 100 for six months. "The Sweetest Taboo" peaked at number five on the US Billboard Hot 100, number one on the US adult Contemporary chart, and number three on the US Hot R&B/Hip-Hop Singles & Tracks. Sade was so popular that some radio stations reinstated the '70s practice of playing album tracks, adding "Is It a Crime" and "Tar Baby" to their playlists. The following year, 1986, the band won a Grammy Award for Best New Artist.

In 1986, Sade made her acting debut in Absolute Beginners, a film adapted from the Colin MacInnes book of the same name about life in late-1950s London. Sade played the role of Athene Duncannon and lent her vocals to the film's accompanying soundtrack. The film was screened out of competition at the 1986 Cannes Film Festival and grossed £1.8 million in the UK.
Sade's third album, Stronger Than Pride, was released on 3 May 1988, and like Sade's previous album became a commercial success and certified three times platinum in the US. The album was popularized by four singles, most notably the album's second single "Paradise", which peaked at number 16 on the US Billboard Hot 100 and peaked at number one on the US Billboard Hot R&B/Hip-Hop Songs, becoming the band's first single to do so.

Love Deluxe was released as the band's fourth studio album on 26 October 1992. The album peaked at number three on the US Billboard 200 and has sold 3.4 million copies in the United States. The album was later certified four times platinum by the RIAA for shipments of four million copies. The album was also commercially successful elsewhere, reaching number-one in France, and reaching the top ten in New Zealand, Sweden, Switzerland, and the UK. The album went on to be certified gold in the United Kingdom. In November 1994, the group released their first compilation album, The Best of Sade. The album was another top ten hit in both the United Kingdom and the United States, certified platinum and four times platinum, respectively.
The compilation album included material from Sade's previous albums, as well as a cover version of "Please Send Me Someone to Love" (1950), originally by Percy Mayfield.

2000–2010: Lovers Rock and second hiatus

Following an eight-year hiatus, the band released their fifth studio album, Lovers Rock, on 13 November 2000 and received positive reviews from music critics.
The album reached number 18 on the UK Albums Chart, number three on the US Billboard 200, and has since been certified triple platinum by the Recording Industry Association of America (RIAA), having sold 3.9 million copies in the United States by February 2010. On 27 February 2002, the album earned Sade the Grammy Award for Best Pop Vocal Album, and the lead single "By Your Side" was nominated for the 2002 Grammy Award for Best Female Pop Vocal Performance. Although the single lost out to Nelly Furtado's "I'm Like a Bird", it has been listed as the 48th greatest love song of all time by VH1.

To promote the album, Sade and the band embarked on their fifth concert tour entitled Lovers Rock Tour. The tour was announced via the band's website in April 2001. The announcement stated the tour would begin in the summer of 2001 with 30 shows. Initial dates were rescheduled due to extended rehearsal time. The shows sold well, with many stops adding additional shows. In August 2001, the tour was extended by eight weeks due to ticket demand. Deemed by many critics as a comeback tour, it marked the band's first performances since 1994 and took place in 2001. Although many believed the trek would expand to other countries, this did not occur. With over 40 shows, it became the 13th biggest tour in North America, earning over 26 million.

Following the tour, the band released their first live album, Lovers Live on 5 February 2002 by Epic Records. Lovers Live reached number ten on the US Billboard 200 and number 51 on the UK Albums Chart, the band's first album to miss the top twenty in the UK. The album was certified gold by the RIAA on 7 March 2002, having reached US sales of 562,000 copies, while the DVD was certified platinum on 30 January 2003 for shipping 100,000 copies.

Following the release of Lovers Rock, Sade took a ten-year hiatus, during which she raised her child and moved to the Caribbean. During this time, she made a rare public appearance for an award ceremony that took place in 2002 to accept an Order of the British Empire (OBE) at Buckingham Palace for services to music. In 2002, she appeared on the Red Hot Organization album, Red Hot + Riot, a compilation CD in tribute to the music of fellow Nigerian musician, Fela Kuti. She recorded a remix of her hit single "By Your Side" for the album and was billed as a co-producer.

2010–2017:  Soldier of Love and third hiatus

The band's sixth studio album, Soldier of Love, was released worldwide on 8 February 2010, and was their first album in ten years to contain new material. Upon release, the album received positive reviews and became a success. The album debuted atop the Billboard 200 in the United States with first-week sales of 502,000 copies. Soldier of Love became the band's first album to debut at number-one and the band's second album to peak at number-one on the chart. The album also had the best sales week by a group since Australian band AC/DC released their album Black Ice and entered the Billboard 200 at number-one in November 2008. Consequently, the band became the act with the longest time between number-one albums, as the band's Promise (1985) and Soldier of Love were separated by 24 years, 10 months and 2 weeks.

The first single and title track, "Soldier of Love", premiered on US radio on 8 December 2009 and was released digitally on 11 January 2010. Subsequent singles, "Babyfather" and "The Moon and the Sky", were played by US urban adult contemporary radio on 13 April and 24 August 2010, respectively. At the 53rd Annual Grammy Awards in 2011, the title track won Best R&B Performance by a Duo or Group with Vocals, while the song, "Babyfather", was nominated for Best Pop Performance by a Duo or Group with Vocals.

In April 2011, the band began their Sade Live tour (also known as the "Once in a Lifetime Tour" or the "Soldier of Love Tour"). The band toured Europe, the Americas, Australia and Asia to promote the band's sixth studio album and their second compilation album, The Ultimate Collection (2011). This trek marked the band's first tour in nearly a decade and ranked 27th in Pollstar's "Top 50 Worldwide Tour (Mid-Year)", earning over 20 million dollars. At the conclusion of 2011, the tour placed tenth on Billboard's annual "Top 25 Tours", earning over $50 million with 59 shows. The tour was chronicled with Bring Me Home - Live 2011, released in May 2012.

2018–present: Return
In March 2018, she (and the reunited band that also bears her name) released the acoustic ballad "Flower of the Universe" for the soundtrack to the Disney film A Wrinkle In Time. About asking Sade to contribute to the album, director Ava DuVernay wrote "I never thought she'd say yes, but asked anyway." Later that year, Sade released "The Big Unknown" for the soundtrack to the 20th Century Fox film Widows. That film's director, Steve McQueen stated that Sade agreed to write the song for the film, because "the original series of Widows had deeply resonated with her." The successor to Soldier of Love is in the works. The band were the first to record their seventh album at the rebuilt Miraval Studios, where they previously recorded Promise and Stronger Than Pride.

Legacy and influence
The New Yorker described Sade's voice as a "grainy contralto full of air that betrays a slight ache but no agony, and values even imperfect dignity over a show of pain", a "deeply English" quality that makes categorising the artist's voice difficult. Her voice was described by the BBC as "husky and restrained" and compared to singer Billie Holiday. BBC called her songwriting "sufficiently soulful and jazzy yet poppy, funky yet easy listening, to appeal to fans of all those genres." Sade has been called a "pop star". With the musicians in her band, Sade, The New Yorker wrote, "created one of the most profitable catalogues in pop"; the band's "easy" sound backing songs "exploring the heavier lifting inside love: commitment, consistency, friendship." Her success has been attributed to a combination of her unique beauty, seemingly indefinable origins, and mysterious persona.

Sade's work has influenced and been recognised by many singers and hip hop artists. Rapper Rakim of Eric B. & Rakim stated he grew up listening to Sade's music and was influenced by her voice and style. Rakim has also referenced Sade's song "Smooth Operator" in the song "Microphone Fiend" (1988). Talib Kweli stated he learned about precision from Sade due to her performance of Love Deluxe in its entirety at Madison Square Garden.  Rapper Missy Elliott cited Sade's performance of "Smooth Operator" as one of her favourites. Hip hop group Souls of Mischief stated they grew up listening to Sade's music. Hip hop group Tanya Morgan also described Sade as one of their favourite artists. Other rappers to recognise Sade include the former rap duo of Clipse – Malice and Pusha. In reaction to the newly released album Soldier of Love, rapper Kanye West wrote, "This is why i still have a blog. To be a part of moments like this ... new Sade ... How much better this ... than everything else?". Rapper Rick Ross stated in an interview that "People may know my infatuation with Sade. There's never been a bad Sade track. I love all different sides."

American singer Beyoncé called Sade's music a "true friend" and an inspiration. The late singer Aaliyah said that she admired Sade because "she stays true to her style no matter what ... she's an amazing artist, an amazing performer ... and I absolutely love her." American R&B singer Brandy has cited Sade as one of her major vocal influences. Heavy metal singer Greg Puciato also named her as an inspiration.

Personal life
Sade squatted in Tottenham in the 1980s, with her boyfriend Robert Elms. In 1989, she married Spanish film director Carlos Pliego. Their marriage ended in 1995. Sade moved briefly to the Caribbean to live with Jamaican music producer Bob Morgan in the late 1990s and gave birth on 21 July 1996 to her first child, who later sang on Sade's song "Babyfather" in 2010. Sade and Morgan later separated, and she has been in a relationship with Ian Watts, a former Royal Marine, since 2007; from this relationship, she has a stepson. In 2016, on National Coming Out Day, Sade's child, Izaak Theo Adu, came out as a transgender man. In September 2019, Izaak posted a message online, thanking his mother for her support through his transition.

In 2005, Sade moved to the Gloucestershire countryside, where she bought a run-down cottage to renovate. She rarely grants interviews.

Honours, awards and nominations

Sade was appointed an Officer of the Order of the British Empire (OBE) in 2002 for services to music, and stated her award was "a great gesture to me and all black women in England". She was promoted to Commander of the same Order (CBE) in the 2017 Birthday Honours, also for services to music. In 1986, she became the first Nigerian-born artiste to win a Grammy Award when she was named Best New Artist. In 2023, Sade was inducted into the Songwriters Hall of Fame.

Discography

Studio albums
Diamond Life (1984)
Promise (1985)
Stronger Than Pride (1988)
Love Deluxe (1992)
Lovers Rock (2000)
Soldier of Love (2010)

Tours
 1984: Diamond Life Tour
 1986: Promise Tour
 1988: Stronger Than Pride Tour
 1993: Love Deluxe World Tour
 2001: Lovers Rock Tour
 2011: Sade Live

See also
 Music history of the United States in the 1980s

References

Further reading

Books

Magazines

Newspapers

Websites

External links

Main
 – official site

Articles
Shapersofthe80s.com – Provides images and stories of Sade Adu's life while a men's clothing designer and part-time model.

1959 births
Living people
20th-century Black British women singers
20th-century squatters
21st-century Black British women singers
Alumni of Saint Martin's School of Art
Ballad musicians
British contraltos
British people of Nigerian descent
British songwriters
British soul singers
Commanders of the Order of the British Empire
Grammy Award winners
Musicians from Essex
Musicians from Ibadan
Nigerian emigrants to the United Kingdom
Nigerian people of English descent
Nigerian songwriters
People from Tendring (district)
Sade (band) members
Singers from London
Smooth jazz singers
Sophisti-pop musicians
Torch singers
Yoruba women musicians